Chronological dating, or simply dating, is the process of attributing to an object or event a date in the past, allowing such object or event to be located in a previously established chronology. This usually requires what is commonly known as a "dating method". Several dating methods exist, depending on different criteria and techniques, and some very well known examples of disciplines using such techniques are, for example, history, archaeology, geology, paleontology, astronomy and even forensic science, since in the latter it is sometimes necessary to investigate the moment in the past during which the death of a cadaver occurred. These methods are typically identified as absolute, which involves a specified date or date range, or relative, which refers to dating which places artifacts or events on a timeline relative to other events and/or artifacts. Other markers can help place an artifact or event in a chronology, such as nearby writings and stratigraphic markers.

Absolute and relative dating 

Dating methods are most commonly classified following two criteria: relative dating and absolute dating.

Relative dating 

Relative dating methods are unable to determine the absolute age of an object or event, but can determine the impossibility of a particular event happening before or after another event of which the absolute date is well known. In this relative dating method, Latin terms ante quem and post quem are usually used to indicate both the most recent and the oldest possible moments when an event occurred or an artifact was left in a stratum, respectively. But this method is also useful in many other disciplines. Historians, for example, know that Shakespeare's play Henry V was not written before 1587 because Shakespeare's primary source for writing his play was the second edition of Raphael Holinshed's Chronicles, not published until 1587. Thus, 1587 is the post quem dating of Shakespeare's play Henry V. That means that the play was without fail written after (in Latin, post) 1587.

The same inductive mechanism is applied in archaeology, geology and paleontology, by many ways. For example, in a stratum presenting difficulties or ambiguities to absolute dating, paleopalynology can be used as a relative referent by means of the study of the pollens found in the stratum. This is admitted because of the simple reason that some botanical species, whether extinct or not, are well known as belonging to a determined position in the scale of time.

For a non-exhaustive list of relative dating methods and relative dating applications used in geology, paleontology or archaeology, see the following:

 Cross-cutting relationships

 Fluorine absorption dating

 Harris matrix

 Law of included fragments

 Law of superposition

 Lichenometry

 Marine isotope stages, based on the oxygen isotope ratio cycle

 Melt inclusions

 Morphology (archaeology)

 Nitrogen dating

 Palynology, the study of modern-dated pollens for the relative dating of archaeological strata, also used in forensic palynology.

 Paleomagnetism

 Paleopalynology, also spelt "Palaeopalynology", the study of fossilized pollens for the relative dating of geological strata.

 Principle of original horizontality

 Principle of lateral continuity

 Principle of faunal succession

 Seriation (archaeology)

 Sequence dating (a type of seriation)

 Tephrochronology

 Typology (archaeology)

 Uranium–lead dating. Lead corrosion dating (exclusively used in archaeology)

 Varnish microlamination

 Vole clock

Absolute dating 

Absolute dating methods seek to establish a specific time during which an object originated or an event took place. While the results of these techniques are largely accepted within the scientific community, there are several factors which can hinder the discovery of accurate absolute dating, including sampling errors and geological disruptions. This type of chronological dating utilizes absolute referent criteria, mainly the radiometric dating methods. Material remains can be absolutely dated by studying the organic materials which construct the remains. For example, remains that have pieces of brick can undergo the process of thermoluminescence (TL) dating in order to determine approximately how many years ago the material was fired. This technique was used to discover the date of St. James Church in Toruń by testing the thermoluminescence of removed bricks. In this example, an absolute date was determined which filled a gap in the historical knowledge of the church.   

These techniques are utilized in many other fields as well. Geologists, for example, apply absolute dating methods to rock sediment in order to discover their period of origin.  

Some examples of both radiometric and non-radiometric absolute dating methods are the following:

 Amino acid dating
 Archaeomagnetic dating

 Argon–argon dating
 Astronomical chronology

 Carbon dating: Reveals the age of artifact, which is used to establish the chronology of the culture. The oldest dates that can be reliably measured by this process date to approximately 50,000 years ago.
 Radiocarbon dating

 Cementochronology, this method does not determine a precise moment in a scale of time but the age at death of a dead individual.

 Datestone (exclusively used in archaeology)
 Dendrochronology

 Electron spin resonance dating
 Fission track dating

 Geochronology
 Herbchronology

 Iodine–xenon dating
 Potassium–argon dating

 Lead–lead dating
 Luminescence dating
 Thermoluminescence dating
 Optically stimulated luminescence
 Optically stimulated luminescence thermochronometry

 Molecular clock (used mostly in phylogenetics and evolutionary biology)

 Obsidian hydration dating (exclusively used in archaeology)
 Oxidizable carbon ratio dating

 Rehydroxylation dating
 Rubidium–strontium dating

 Samarium–neodymium dating

 Tephrochronology

 Uranium–lead dating
 Uranium–thorium dating
 Uranium–uranium dating, useful in dating samples between about 10,000 and 2 million years Before Present (BP), or up to about eight times the half-life of 234U.

 Wiggle matching

Dating methods in archaeology 
Just like geologists or paleontologists, archaeologists are also brought to determine the age of both ancient and recent humans. Thus, to be considered as archaeological, the remains, objects or artifacts to be dated must be related to human activity. It is commonly assumed that if the remains or elements to be dated are older than the human species, the disciplines which study them are sciences such geology or paleontology, among some others.

Nevertheless, the range of time within archaeological dating can be enormous compared to the average lifespan of a singular human being. As an example Pinnacle Point's caves, in the southern coast of South Africa, provided evidence that marine resources (shellfish) have been regularly exploited by humans as of 170,000 years ago. On the other hand, remains as recent as a hundred years old can also be the target of archaeological dating methods. It was the case of an 18th-century sloop whose excavation was led in South Carolina (United States) in 1992. Thus, from the oldest to the youngest, all archaeological sites are likely to be dated by an appropriate method.

Dating material drawn from the archaeological record can be made by a direct study of an artifact, or may be deduced by association with materials found in the context the item is drawn from or inferred by its point of discovery in the sequence relative to datable contexts. Dating is carried out mainly post excavation, but to support good practice, some preliminary dating work called "spot dating" is usually run in tandem with excavation. Dating is very important in archaeology for constructing models of the past, as it relies on the integrity of dateable objects and samples. Many disciplines of archaeological science are concerned with dating evidence, but in practice several different dating techniques must be applied in some circumstances, thus dating evidence for much of an archaeological sequence recorded during excavation requires matching information from known absolute or some associated steps, with a careful study of stratigraphic relationships.

In addition, because of its particular relation with past human presence or past human activity, archaeology uses almost all the dating methods that it shares with the other sciences, but with some particular variations, like the following:

Written markers
 Epigraphy – analysis of inscriptions, via identifying graphemes, clarifying their meanings, classifying their uses according to dates and cultural contexts, and drawing conclusions about the writing and the writers.
 Numismatics – many coins have the date of their production written on them or their use is specified in the historical record.
 Palaeography – the study of ancient writing, including the practice of deciphering, reading, and dating historical manuscripts.

Seriation 
Seriation is a relative dating method (see, above, the list of relative dating methods). An example of a practical application of seriation, is the comparison of the known style of artifacts such as stone tools or pottery.

Age-equivalent stratigraphic markers
 Paleomagnetism (a relative dating method, see the corresponding list above)
 Marine isotope stages based on the oxygen isotope ratio cycle (a relative dating method, see the corresponding list above)
 Tephrochronology (an absolute dating method, see the corresponding list above)

Stratigraphic relationships 

The stratigraphy of an archaeological site can be used to date, or refine the date, of particular activities ("contexts") on that site. For example, if a context is sealed between two other contexts of known date, it can be inferred that the middle context must date to between those dates.

See also 

 Astronomical chronology
 Age of Earth
 Age of the universe

 Geochronology
 Geologic time scale
 Geological history of Earth

Archaeological science

References 

Chronology